William H. Stevens (1818–1880) was an American architect from Lewiston, Maine.

Life
Stevens was born in West Gardiner, Maine in 1818.  He learned the carpenter's trade, and moved to Lewiston in 1849, acquiring land on the outskirts of town.  in 1851 he and five others went to California, to try their hand at prospecting.  He returned to Lewiston in 1855, continuing to work as a carpenter.  In 1864 he took a position with the Franklin Company, and became the in-house architect and engineer, a position he retained until 1870.  That year, he opened an independent office as an architect.

Stevens worked alone until 1873, when he formed a partnership with Edward F. Fassett, son of Francis.  The firm, Fassett & Stevens, was dissolved in 1874, in the wake of the Panic of 1873.  Stevens resumed his independent practice, and Fassett returned to his father in Portland.  After a brief period, Stevens and George M. Coombs formed a new partnership, Stevens & Coombs.  They remained together until Stevens' death in August 1880, after a period of illness.

Stevens served on the Lewiston city council, and was elected mayor in 1870.

Architectural Works
William H. Stevens, 1864-1873:
 1864 - Worumbo Mill, Canal St, Lisbon Falls, Maine
 Burned in 1987
 1867 - Lincoln Boarding House, 100 Main St, Lewiston, Maine
 Demolished in 1964
 1868 - Bates Street School, 255 Bates St, Lewiston, Maine
 Has lost its Mansard roof
 1868 - Savings Bank Block, 215 Lisbon St, Lewiston, Maine
 1870 - Bonnallie Block, 249 Main St, Lewiston, Maine
 1870 - Pilsbury Block, 200-210 Lisbon St, Lewiston, Maine
 1871 - Roak Block, 156 Main St, Auburn, Maine
 1872 - Farwell Mill, 244 Lisbon St, Lisbon, Maine
Fassett & Stevens, 1873-1874:
 1873 - William P. Frye House, 457 Main St, Lewiston, Maine
 1873 - Pilsbury Block (Addition), 200-210 Lisbon St, Lewiston, Maine
 1874 - Webster Grammar School, 45 Spring St, Auburn, Maine
 Demolished
William H. Stevens, 1874-1875:
 1874 - Goodwin R. Wiley House, 39 Church St, Bethel, Maine
 Demolished
Stevens & Coombs, 1875-1880:
 1876 - William Bradford House, 54 Pine St, Lewiston, Maine
 Demolished in 2007
 1876 - Farwell Bleachery, 39 S Canal St, Lawrence, Massachusetts
 Burned in 1994
 1876 - Odd Fellows Block, 182–190 Lisbon St, Lewiston, Maine
 1877 - Edward Little High School, 30 Academy St, Auburn, Maine
 Demolished
 1878 - Charles Gay House, 64 Highland Ave, Auburn, Maine
 1878 - Lewiston Water Works, 38 Island Ave, Lewiston, Maine
 Only the gatehouse remains
 1879 - Auburn Engine House, 158 Court St, Auburn, Maine
 1879 - Squirrell Island Chapel, S Shore Ave, Squirrel Island, Maine

References

Architects from Maine
1818 births
1880 deaths
People from Lewiston, Maine
19th-century American architects
People from West Gardiner, Maine